The canton of Pont-Saint-Esprit is an administrative division of the Gard department, southern France. Its borders were modified at the French canton reorganisation which came into effect in March 2015. Its seat is in Pont-Saint-Esprit.

It consists of the following communes:
 
Aiguèze
Carsan
Cornillon
Le Garn
Goudargues
Issirac
Laval-Saint-Roman
Montclus
Pont-Saint-Esprit
La Roque-sur-Cèze
Saint-Alexandre
Saint-André-de-Roquepertuis
Saint-André-d'Olérargues
Saint-Christol-de-Rodières
Saint-Gervais
Saint-Julien-de-Peyrolas
Saint-Laurent-de-Carnols
Saint-Marcel-de-Careiret
Saint-Michel-d'Euzet
Saint-Nazaire
Saint-Paulet-de-Caisson
Salazac
Vénéjan
Verfeuil

References

Cantons of Gard